Araethyrea was in Greek mythology a daughter of Aras, an autochthon who was believed to have built Arantea, the most ancient town in Phlius. She had a brother called Aoris, and is said to have been fond of the chase and warlike pursuits.

Mythology 
When Araethyrea died, her brother called the country of Phlius after her. She was the mother of Phlias. The monuments of Araethyrea and her brother, consisting of round pillars, were still extant in the time of Pausanias; and before the mysteries of Demeter were commenced at Phlius, the people always invoked Aras and his two children with their faces turned towards their monuments.

Notes

References 

 Homer, The Iliad with an English Translation by A.T. Murray, Ph.D. in two volumes. Cambridge, MA., Harvard University Press; London, William Heinemann, Ltd. 1924. . Online version at the Perseus Digital Library.
 Homer, Homeri Opera in five volumes. Oxford, Oxford University Press. 1920. . Greek text available at the Perseus Digital Library.
 Pausanias, Description of Greece with an English Translation by W.H.S. Jones, Litt.D., and H.A. Ormerod, M.A., in 4 Volumes. Cambridge, MA, Harvard University Press; London, William Heinemann Ltd. 1918. . Online version at the Perseus Digital Library
 Pausanias, Graeciae Descriptio. 3 vols. Leipzig, Teubner. 1903.  Greek text available at the Perseus Digital Library.
 Strabo, The Geography of Strabo. Edition by H.L. Jones. Cambridge, Mass.: Harvard University Press; London: William Heinemann, Ltd. 1924. Online version at the Perseus Digital Library.
 Strabo, Geographica edited by A. Meineke. Leipzig: Teubner. 1877. Greek text available at the Perseus Digital Library.

Princesses in Greek mythology

Mythology of Argolis